RRIF may stand for:

 Registered Retirement Income Fund (Canada)
 Railroad Rehabilitation and Improvement Financing (U.S.A.)
 Resource Release Is Finalization, an alternate name for the Resource Acquisition Is Initialization (RAII) programming idiom